The Kids Are Alright is an American television sitcom created by Tim Doyle for ABC, inspired by Doyle's own childhood. The series is a single-camera comedy about an Irish Catholic family raising eight sons in suburban Los Angeles circa 1972, navigating the trials and tribulations of the era.

The series stars Michael Cudlitz and Mary McCormack as parents Mike and Peggy Cleary, with Jack Gore, Sam Straley, Caleb Foote, Sawyer Barth, Christopher Paul Richards, Andy Walken, and Santino Barnard starring as their first seven sons. The series received a put pilot commitment at ABC in September 2017, with a pilot ordered in January 2018. The Kids Are Alright was ordered to series by ABC in May 2018, and it was picked up for a full season of 22 episodes in November 2018. ABC ordered an additional episode in December 2018, bringing the order to 23 episodes. Filming for the series took place primarily in the Van Nuys area of Los Angeles.

The series premiered on October 16, 2018, and received generally positive reviews, a 2019 Best Comedy Episode nomination from the Writers Guild of America for its pilot script, and a 97% on Rotten Tomatoes. Despite these accolades, on May 10, 2019, new management at ABC canceled the series after one season.

Cast and characters

Main 
 Mary McCormack as Peggy Cleary, mother
 Michael Cudlitz as Mike Cleary, father
 Jack Gore as Timmy, fifth son
 Sam Straley as Lawrence, first son 
 Caleb Foote as Eddie, second son
 Sawyer Barth as Frank (Francis), third son
 Christopher Paul Richards as Joey, fourth son
 Andy Walken as William, sixth son
 Santino Barnard as Pat (Patrick), seventh son
 Sawyer and Jax Laucius as Andy, eighth son, an infant
 Tim Doyle as the narrator, voice of adult Timmy

Recurring
 Kennedy Lea Slocum as Wendi Falkenberry, Eddie's girlfriend
 Paul Dooley as Father Cecil Dunne
 Markie Post as Helen Portello, Peggy's friend and nemesis
 Jojo Nwoko as Father Bootaan Abdi
 Thomas Barbusca as Davey, Joey's best friend
 Michael Cornacchia as Boxcar Benji
 Sarah Benoit as Sister Euphemia
 Martha Boles as Jenny, Wendi's classmate
 Galadriel Stineman as Fiona, Lawrence's girlfriend

Guest

 Aidan Wallace as young Lawrence
 Gracen Newton as young Eddie
 Connor Cain as Bobby (S1, E5)
 Nat Faxon as Tom, Peggy's brother (S1, E8)
 Ken Jeong as Grover Young, Mike's co-worker (S1, E9)
 Dara Renee as Melissa, Wendy's classmate (S1, E10)
 Jason Rogel as Mailman
 David Alan Smith as The Great Pepe (S1, E12)
 Ray Porter as Ernie (S1, E15)
 Danny Bonaduce as Boris and Danny Partridge (archive footage) (S1, E17)
 Emma Meisel as Angela, Frank's love interest (S1, E20)
 Josh McDermitt as Mr. Crane, Mike's boss (S1, E21)
 Jeff Holman as Terry, Mike's co-worker (S1, E21)
 Mary Passeri as Marybeth (S1, E21)
 Jim Meskimen as Johnny Carson (voice) (S1, E21)
 Hal Alpert as Mr. Franklin (S1, E20)
 Jo Farkas as Rita (S1, E20)
 Carol Gutierrez as Darlene (S1, E20)
 Regan Burns as Tex O'Shaughnessy (S1, E22)
 Nancy Berggren as Mrs. Ava Greenblatt (S1, E22)
 Jenny O'Hara as Aunt Tess (S1, E22)
 Willie Tyler as himself (S1, E23)

Episodes

Production

Development
Series creator Tim Doyle grew up in an Irish Catholic family in Glendale, California, near Los Angeles, in the 1970s; this makes the show semi-autobiographical. The series is produced by ABC Studios.

ABC officially ordered the series to pilot on January 19, 2018. In February 2018, Randall Einhorn signed on to direct and executive produce the pilot. On May 11, 2018, ABC ordered the show to series and announced that the series would be titled The Kids Are Alright. On November 7, 2018, the series was picked up for a full season of 22 episodes. On December 14, 2018, ABC ordered an additional episode of the first season, bringing the order to 23 episodes.

Casting
On February 13, 2018, Michael Cudlitz was cast as Mike Dwyer. A few days later, Mary McCormack was cast as Peggy Dwyer. By the end of the month, Sam Straley had joined the cast as Lawrence, along with Caleb Foote as Eddie, Christopher Paul Richards as Joey, and Jack Gore as Timmy. In early March 2018, Sawyer Barth was cast as Frank. That month, it was also revealed that Andy Walken and Santino Barnard had also joined the series. With the series order in May, the family name was changed from the Dwyers to the Clearys.

Music
Siddhartha Khosla served as the primary composer for the series.

Broadcast
The series premiered on October 16, 2018, on ABC in the United States, and on CTV in Canada.

Reception

Ratings

Critical response
The review aggregator website Rotten Tomatoes reported an 82% approval rating with an average rating of 6.62/10 based on 17 reviews. The website's consensus reads, "The Kids are Alright is a surprisingly poignant, thoughtful show with a classic sitcom feel." Metacritic, which uses a weighted average, assigned a score of 71 out of 100 based on 7 critics, indicating "generally favorable reviews."

Accolades

References

External links
 

2010s American single-camera sitcoms
2018 American television series debuts
2019 American television series endings
American Broadcasting Company original programming
English-language television shows
Television series by ABC Studios
Television series set in 1972
Television series set in 1973
Television series about families
Television shows set in Los Angeles